Milivoje Ćirković (born 14 April 1977) is a Serbian former professional footballer who played as a defender.

Club career
After returning from his loan at Milicionar, Ćirković played his first official game for Partizan in November 1999. He became a first-team regular in the 2000–01 season, making a career-high 34 appearances across all competitions.

In the 2001–02 and 2002–03 seasons, Ćirković helped Partizan win back-to-back championship titles. He was subsequently a member of the team that reached the group stage of the 2003–04 UEFA Champions League, converting the decisive penalty in the shoot-out against Newcastle United in the final qualifying round.

In January 2006, Ćirković extended his contract with Partizan for another four years. He was deemed surplus to requirements after failing to make any appearances in the 2007–08 season.

International career
Ćirković was capped nine times for Serbia and Montenegro (previously known as FR Yugoslavia). He made his international debut in November 2000, coming on as a substitute for Nenad Sakić in a 2–1 away friendly loss to Romania.

In January 2001, Ćirković represented his country at the Millennium Super Soccer Cup, as they would go on to win the tournament. However, these caps are not officially recognized by FIFA.

Career statistics

Club

International

Honours
Partizan
 First League of Serbia and Montenegro: 2001–02, 2002–03, 2004–05
 Serbia and Montenegro Cup: 2000–01

References

External links
 
 
 
 
 

Association football defenders
First League of Serbia and Montenegro players
FK Budućnost Valjevo players
FK Milicionar players
FK Partizan players
FK Teleoptik players
Serbia and Montenegro footballers
Serbia and Montenegro international footballers
Serbian footballers
Serbian SuperLiga players
1977 births
Living people